Walnut soup is a broth-based or cream-based soup prepared using walnuts as a main ingredient. It is sometimes prepared in combinations using other ingredients, such as "pumpkin and walnut soup". Walnut soup is a part of the cuisines of China, Italy and Mexico.

Overview

Walnut soup is prepared using walnuts as a primary ingredient. The soup can be prepared as a broth-based or cream-based soup, and the latter can be referred to as "cream of walnut soup". Fresh or canned shelled walnuts can be used, and the soup can include puréed, chopped and whole walnuts. Toasted walnuts can be used to prepare the soup. Walnut soup is sometimes prepared in combinations using other ingredients, such as "squash and walnut soup", "pumpkin and walnut soup" and "cucumber and walnut soup", among others. Additional ingredients can include butter, oil, walnut oil, lemon juice, seasonings, salt and pepper.

By country
Hup Tul Woo is a sweet walnut soup in Cantonese cuisine that is often eaten as a snack or dessert. Basic ingredients in Hup Tul Woo includes water, walnuts, rice flour and sugar. Additional ingredients used in its preparation can include cream, coconut milk, Chinese red dates, rice, peen tong (Chinese brown candy), ginger, salt and cognac. The walnuts for the soup are typically puréed or finely ground. It can be served as a hot or cold soup.

 (English: walnut soup) is a part of Italian cuisine, where it is prepared in the region of Piedmont, which has a significant number of walnut groves. In Piedmont, it is typically prepared during the months of winter.

 (English: walnut soup) is a soup in Mexican cuisine. It can be served hot or cold, and sometimes has a delicate texture.

See also

 List of soups
 List of Chinese soups
 List of Italian soups
 Pickled walnuts
 Walnut and coffee cake
 Walnut pie

Notes

References

External links
 Walnut Soup recipe. Epicurious.

Chinese soups
Italian soups
Mexican soups
Walnut dishes